The Helsingborg Open is a women's professional golf tournament held at Vasatorp Golf Club in Helsingborg, Sweden. It first featured on the Ladies European Tour (LET) in 2013.

The tournament was first played on the Swedish Golf Tour in 2010. The 2013 event marked the return of the LET to Sweden following a hiatus, after the last installments of the Scandinavian TPC hosted by Annika and the Göteborg Masters were played in 2008. Vasatorp hosted the Compaq Open in 2002.

Winners

References

External links
 
Ladies European Tour

Ladies European Tour events
Swedish Golf Tour (women) events
Golf tournaments in Sweden
Recurring sporting events established in 2010